Matthew McNeely (May 11, 1920 – September 11, 2002) was a Michigan state politician. He served for over 20 years in the Michigan House of Representatives and was speaker pro tempore of the House for a record 18 years. In recognition of his service in the chair, the House voted to make McNeely Speaker pro tempore emeritus.

References

External links
House Resolution 0542 (2002) - A resolution of tribute offered as a memorial for Matthew McNeely, former member of the House

1920 births
2002 deaths
African-American state legislators in Michigan
Democratic Party members of the Michigan House of Representatives
20th-century American politicians
20th-century African-American politicians
21st-century African-American people